Jak II is an action-adventure video game developed by Naughty Dog and published by Sony Computer Entertainment for the PlayStation 2 in 2003. It is the second game of the Jak and Daxter series and both a sequel and prequel to Jak and Daxter: The Precursor Legacy. It was followed by Jak 3 the following year in 2004.

The game features new weapons and devices, new playable areas, and a storyline that picks up after the events of Jak and Daxter: The Precursor Legacy. The player takes on the dual role of protagonists Jak and Daxter.

Jak II received critical acclaim upon release. Critics applauded the game for being very polished in nearly every department, with many agreeing it was one of the best PlayStation 2 games released at the time. Some criticism, however, was directed at the checkpoint systems, darker tone, and high difficulty. The game is notorious among gamers for being one of the most difficult games on the PlayStation 2.

Gameplay 
The core gameplay of Jak II remains somewhat similar to that of the previous game, with a recurring reliance on platforming challenges and vehicle usage. However, it is significantly different in some areas. The Eco timed power-up gameplay from the previous game has been removed, and introduction of weapons such as the Morph Gun, a multipurpose firearm, adds a greater emphasis on enemy combat. The player can unlock four different gun mods for the gun as they play through the game; the shotgun-esque Scatter Gun for close range fighting, the semi-automatic Blaster, for long-range fighting, the Vulcan Fury, a high rate-of-fire weapon in the fashion of a minigun, the bullets of which deal less damage per round compared to the Blaster but are able to pierce enemies and breakables so it can hit multiple targets with a single round, and the Peace Maker, which fires charged blasts of energy, and is extremely powerful, chaining an instant kill energy between enemies that are in close proximity to each other. The game also inherits the melee abilities of the prior game, and chaining a melee attack into a weapon fire usually increases the effect of the gun. For example, the Scatter Gun fires quicker than normal, the Blaster fires three shots at once, and the Vulcan Fury immediately reaches its maximum fire rate, but only if a melee strike is done right before the Morph Gun is fired.

Haven City functions as the game hub world, with various other environments accessible from it. Here, Jak can access new missions by visiting various allied characters. These missions serve as a replacement for the previous game's Power Cell collection driven gameplay in the first installment of the series. Throughout the game, the player can collect Precursor Orbs which are sparsely dispersed throughout the various worlds. The Orbs are non-essential to completion of the game but allow the player to unlock cheats and other "secret" content. Jak can traverse the large city using hover vehicles and a jet-board which allows him to hover across water and grind on rails.

Due to experiments conducted on him for two years, Jak has also gained the ability to manipulate Dark Eco to transform into a darker version of himself known as Dark Jak. The form is only accessible after Jak has absorbed enough Dark Eco to charge his ability. Dark Eco drops from slain enemies and can occasionally be found in red crates scattered throughout the world. In his Dark form, Jak becomes much more agile and his melee attacks become more powerful but he loses the ability to use the Morph Gun. Jak 2 also introduces a "currency" known as Metal Head skull gems. By collecting these skull gems which are dropped by most Metal Head creatures when defeated, Jak can gain additional abilities for his dark form and play minigames at kiosks throughout Haven City. The Dark Jak abilities that can be unlocked can be used to unleash devastating attacks that kill all enemies within the vicinity at the cost of ending his Dark form immediately after the attack.

Plot

Setting 
Jak II takes place in the same fictional universe created by Naughty Dog for Jak and Daxter, though five hundred years after the events of the first game. The game largely revolves around Haven City, a dystopia ruled by Baron Praxis and his Krimzon Guard law enforcers. Haven City serves as the game's hub location, although the player is frequently given tasks that must be fulfilled outside of the city.

Characters 

Jak (voiced by Mike Erwin) is the game's protagonist, along with his sidekick Daxter (voiced by Max Casella). When they first arrived in Haven City, Jak was captured by Krimzon Guards and became the subject of Baron Praxis's (voiced by Clancy Brown) "Dark Warrior" project. He became subjected to several experiments, ultimately giving him the ability to become "Dark Jak", a beastly version of himself which is unleashed when Jak has gathered enough Dark Eco. Daxter is an otter-weasel hybrid (known as an ottsel) and is the game's comic relief. After two years of searching for him, Daxter finally sneaks into the prison holding Jak and rescues him. This is also the first time Jak is heard speaking in the series, which is heavily lampshaded by other returning characters throughout the story.

Other important characters include Torn (voiced by Cutter Garcia), the second-in-command of the resistance movement known as the Underground; Sig (voiced by Phil LaMarr), a Metal Head hunter/Wastelander (someone who gathers artifacts from outside the city); Krew (voiced by Bill Minkin), a vastly overweight gang lord; Tess (voiced by Britton A. Hill), a barmaid; Errol (voiced by David Herman), the Baron's right-hand man and commander of the Krimzon Guard; and Ashelin (voiced by Susan Eisenberg), the daughter of Baron Praxis who helps the Underground behind her father's back. Baron Praxis and the Metal Heads' leader Kor are the story's antagonists.

Story 
Following Gol and Maia's defeat, Jak and Daxter join Samos the Green Sage to witness his daughter Kiera's efforts at testing an ancient artifact known as the Rift Rider: a mechanical device linked to an ancient portal called a Rift Gate. Upon Jak activating the device, the gate opens and allows strange creatures to flood the world, before the rider sucks the group within it. Both Jak and Daxter become separate in the journey from the others, and eventually land in Haven City—a dystopia ruled by the tyrannical Baron Praxis, and guarded by the Krimzon Guard, a paramilitary force led by Praxis's right-hand man Errol. While Daxter is forced to run away, Jak is arrested by Errol, whereupon he is put through a series of experiments for two years by Praxis involving Dark Eco, in an attempt to create a new soldier.

During a break in experimentation Daxter finds Jak and breaks him out of the facility, though the pair discover that Praxis' experiments have left Jak with the ability to transform into a Dark Eco version of himself with increased strength, reflexes, stamina and aggression. Accessing the city, the pair encounter an elderly man named Kor, protecting a young boy known only as The Kid, who sends them to make contact with the Underground—a resistance movement led by the mysterious figure known as the Shadow, seeking to bring down Praxis and replace him with the city's rightful heir, The Kid. Meeting with the Shadow's lieutenant, Torn, the pair learn that Praxis is seeking to protect the city from creatures known as Metal Heads, an evil biomechanical race dating back from Precursor times. Working for the Underground, the pair eventually discover that they have been flung nearly 500 years into the future, after finding the remains of their home village in the city's borders. To further complicate the matter, the pair also learn that the Shadow is none other than Samos—albeit, a younger version, unaware of the ruins significance.

Learning that Praxis is seeking an item within a tomb of the city's founder, Jak and Daxter continue working for the Underground, along the way taking work for the crime lord Krew, and reuniting with Kiera, who works as a mechanic in the city's arena. In the process, the pair discover Praxis created the war with the Metal Heads, bringing them with eco to attack the city so he could remain in command, but lost control when the Metal Heads betrayed him. Working with Young Samos, the pair eventually help the Underground access the tomb, but become separated when it closes shut on them. With no choice, the pair search the tomb and discover an ancient artifact within called the Precursor Stone, which Praxis steals in hopes of cracking it open and use its destruction that can destroy the Metal Heads, despite it having the potential to wipe out Haven City.

Seeking to rescue the Underground, after its chief members were kidnapped in their absence, Jak and Daxter reunite with the older version of Samos, who warns the group that The Kid must be found urgently, despite Young Samos contradicting his instructions. However, Jak and Daxter soon find they must, after preventing Praxis from completing his bomb with the assistance of Krew, whom the pair kill. Shortly after Krew's death, Metal Heads swarm into the city, forcing the Underground and Krimzon Guard to join forces to resist the invasion. At the same time, Jak and Daxter track down Praxis and find him meeting with Kor, who transpires to be the Metal Heads' leader in disguise and had been seeking to use The Kid in order to bring the world into ruin. Departing to complete a ritual he had been working, Kor kills Praxis, who entrusts the Precursor Stone to Jak and Daxter. The pair swiftly pursue after Kor, killing him and finding the very Rift Gate they used to travel through time, and ending the Metal Heads threat.

The Kid, whom Jak had discovered was his younger self, touches the Stone, reawakening the Precursor entity within, which flies through the gate. As Kiera arrives with a new Rift Rider she had created, Samos reveals that they cannot return to the past—instead, Jak's younger self and Young Samos must go, in order to ensure Jak will fulfill the destiny he completed with Kor's defeat. In the aftermath of the conflict, Daxter takes over Krew's bar, as he, Jak, Samos and Kiera prepare to enjoy their new lives in Haven City.

Development and release 
Jak II began development in 2001. Jak II is the only game in the series in which the versions for English-speaking regions feature the Japanese and Korean voice-over track. The voice-over cast features many notable voice actors, including Showtaro Morikubo as Jak. The other games in the series did not follow suit, leaving the voices to be exclusive to the Japanese and Korean regions. The game's budget was more than $10 million. It took 52 people, 140 voice actors, two musicians, and three sound engineers, plus Sony's internal staff. The voice-acting was jointly recorded in the Los Angeles-based Pop Sound and the New York City-based Howard Schwartz Recording.

Reception 

Jak II received "generally positive reviews", according to review aggregator Metacritic. IGN gave it a score of 9.5/10, saying: "Naughty Dog weighs in with heavy guns, a dark story and mature content…And unlike pretty much every other platformer in the world, the story here is filled with characters who you'll either love or hate. It's the story that gives this game the feeling that it's an adventure, like Indiana Jones or even Max Payne. Jak is far more likeable now that he speaks, and the fact that he's pissed off and owns honking big guns weaves in an unmistakable new level of emotion into the narrative." GameSpot said, "Everything in Jak II comes together to produce one of the best-looking, best-playing games on the PS2 so far" and continued: "Jak II is an enormous and ambitious game that succeeds on every level, the gameplay is rewarding, and the story twists and turns more than you'd expect from a game like this." Game Informer praised "having the freedom to tackle challenges in a less linear fashion" and likened the new gameplay to the Grand Theft Auto series.

Steven Petite and Jon Bitner of Digital Trends consider Jak II to be the best in the series and one of the PlayStation 2's best platformers. Kotaku Luke Plunkett called Jak II one of the best PlayStation 2 games, highlighting the game's scale and characters.

Criticisms were given to Jak II shortage of mission checkpoints and overall difficulty. As Naughty Dog developer Josh Scherr once admitted: "One thing that everybody can agree on though, is that the game is just way too fucking hard." IGN named Jak II the #8 hardest PlayStation 2 game, citing its combat, platforming, city navigation, and instant death scenarios. Official U.S. PlayStation Magazine remarked: "It isn't proper to expect us to be perfect in order to make up for your game's many imbalances… Life might not be fair, but I certainly expect my games to be." However, some saw the challenge as a positive, such as PlayStation Magazine, who said: "I appreciate a good challenge in today's games, and JAK II offers it."

Accolades 
Jak II won Editor's Choice from IGN and GameSpot, and was followed by a nomination for Best PlayStation 2 Game by GameSpot as well. GameSpot named it the best PlayStation 2 game of October 2003.

Jak II was added to Sony's Greatest Hits lineup on September 8, 2004, signifying at least 400,000 copies sold in its first 11 months. Jak II received a "Platinum Prize" in Japan for sales of over one million units. Worldwide, the game sold more than 1.6 million units by April 2004.

Remasters 
In 2012, Jak II was remastered in the Jak and Daxter Collection on the PlayStation 3, with the collection releasing on the PlayStation Vita a year later. In 2017, Jak II was made available to play on the PlayStation 4 via emulation, featuring high-definition graphics and trophy support.

References

External links 

 
 
 

2003 video games
Cyberpunk video games
Dystopian video games
Action-adventure games
Jak and Daxter
Naughty Dog games
Open-world video games
PlayStation 2 games
PlayStation 2-only games
Post-apocalyptic video games
Science fiction video games
Single-player video games
Video games about time travel
Video game sequels
Video game prequels
Video games developed in the United States
Video games about revenge
Video games scored by Josh Mancell
Video games set on fictional planets
3D platform games